The Blue Rose is a New Zealand crime drama television series, which was created by Rachel Lang and James Griffin and produced by South Pacific Pictures. It stars Antonia Prebble as Jane and Siobhan Marshall as Linda. Marshall and Prebble had previously worked together on Outrageous Fortune.

The series aired in New Zealand on TV3 from 4 February to 29 April 2013, at 8:30 p.m. for three episodes; it then moved to 9:30 p.m. for three episodes, and then moved again to 9:40 p.m. for five episodes, before moving to 9:45 p.m. on Mondays for the remaining two episodes.

Production 
Funding for the series was approved by NZ On Air in December 2011. The show was cancelled in December 2013 by a radio announcement on Radio New Zealand by TV3 programming boss Mark Caulton.

Plot 
Jane is a humble office temp who takes on a new post at an inner city law firm and soon realises she's not just filling in for a secretary with the flu – she's sitting in a dead woman's chair.

The deceased woman is Rose, whose best friend Linda is convinced that she was murdered despite police reports to the contrary. Linda quickly enlists Jane in her quest to find the truth and together they recruit the IT guy and the lady from payroll and form the Society of the Blue Rose.

With some help from friends on the lowlier rungs of other businesses – the group fight high-stakes crimes and shadowy corporate skulduggery to uncover the truth about Rose. They are united in purpose – and tattoos – to seek out further injustices. But proving guilt is always harder than suspecting it.

Cast and characters

Main 
 Antonia Prebble as Jane March – A Temp P.A. to Simon at Mosely & Loveridge.
 Siobhan Marshall as Linda Frame – Rose's best friend and godmother to her daughter Nina, She manages a courier firm in Auckland.
 Matt Minto as Simon Frost – Jane's boss and Senior Partner at Mosely & Loveridge.
 Rajeev Varma as Ganesh Nishad – An I.T. manager at Mosely & Loveridge.
 Jenny Ludlam as Sonya Whitwell – An accountant who used to work at Mosely & Loveridge.

Recurring 
 James Trevena-Brown as Charlie Bryson – A junior lawyer at Mosely & Loveridge.
 Anna Jullienne as Krystle Wilkinson – Helen's P.A. at Mosely & Loveridge.
 George Mason as Ben Gallagher – Jane's ex-boyfriend, who was caught cheating on her.
 Stelios Yiakmis as Derek Peterson – A wealthy financier and entrepreneur.
 Theresa Healey as Helen Irwin – Simon's partner at Mosely & Loveridge.
 Luciane Buchanan as Aroha Nash – A receptionist at Mosely & Loveridge.
 Tim Foley as Grant Finch – Rose's ex-husband.
 Caren Pistorius as Rose Harper – Simon's former P.A. at Mosely & Loveridge, she died under mysterious circumstances.
 Jay Saussey as Amy – Peterson's P.A..
 Jeremy Randerson as Adam Revill
 Kyle Pryor as Anton
 Josephine Davison as Felicity Frost – Simon's wife.
 John Rawls as Karl Villiers
 Nisha Madhan as Varsha – Ganesh's cop friend.
 Murray Keane as Keith Cranston
 Ayşe Tezel as Hannah

Episodes 

  Number includes additional viewers from a 9:30 p.m. rebroadcast airing the same night on TV3 Plus 1.
 Each episode title is named after a song by The Smiths.

Broadcast 
In Australia, the show premiered on Gem on 26 November 2013.

Awards and nominations

DVD release

References

External links 
 
 
 
 The Blue Rose at South Pacific Pictures

2010s New Zealand television series
2013 New Zealand television series debuts
2013 New Zealand television series endings
English-language television shows
New Zealand drama television series
New Zealand mystery television series
Television shows filmed in New Zealand
Television shows funded by NZ on Air
Television series by All3Media
Television series by South Pacific Pictures
Television shows set in New Zealand
Three (TV channel) original programming